Gherardo is a given name. Notable people with the name include:

Gherardo Appiani (1370–1405), the lord of Piombino from 1398 until his death
Gherardo Bosio (1903–1941), Italian architect, engineer and urbanist
Gherardo III da Camino (1240–1306), Italian feudal lord and military leader
Giovanni Gherardo Dalle Catene (1520–1533), Italian painter of the Renaissance
Gherardo Cibo (1512–1600), artist and a herbalist from Italy
Gherardo Colombo (born 1946), Italian former magistrate and judge
Gherardo da Cremona (1114–1187), Italian translator of scientific books from Arabic into Latin
Gherardo D'Ambrosio (1930–2014), Italian magistrate and politician
Gherardo di Giovanni del Fora (1445–1497), Italian painter
Maffeo Gherardo (1406–1492), Italian Roman Catholic bishop and cardinal
Gherardo Gossi (born 1958), Italian cinematographer
Gherardo della Notte (1592–1656), Dutch Golden Age painter
Gherardo Perini, model for Michelangelo who came to work for him around 1520
Gherardo Segarelli (1240–1300), the founder of the Apostolic Brethren
Gherardo Silvani (1579–1675), Italian architect and sculptor
Gherardo Hercolani Fava Simonetti (born 1941), the Grand Commander of the Sovereign Military Order of Malta
Gherardo Starnina (1360–1413), Italian painter from Florence in the Quattrocento era

See also
Fra Gherardo, opera in three acts composed by Ildebrando Pizzetti who also wrote the libretto
Gerard
Gerardo